This is a list of all the yachts built by CRN S.p.A., sorted by year.

1969–1999

2000–2009

2010–2019

2020–present

Under construction

See also
 List of motor yachts by length
 Luxury yacht

References

CRN S.p.A.
Built by CRN S.p.A.
Built by CRN S.p.A.
CRN S.p.A.
Ferretti Group